is a city located in Osaka Prefecture, Japan. , the city had an estimated population of 83,995 in 37,778 households and a population density of 1900 persons per km².

Geography
Kaizuka is located in the southern part of Izumi Region in Osaka Prefecture, bordered by Osaka Bay to the northwest. The Kogi River flows from east to west, the Tsuda River forms the line between this city and Kishiwada City, and the Mide River is a city boundary with Izumisano City. Nankai Main Line and Hanwa Line run from south to north, and the Mizuma Railway runs from east to west. Mount Izumi Katsuragi is partly in Kaizuka territory.

Neighboring municipalities
Osaka Prefecture
Kishiwada
Izumisano
Kumatori
Wakayama Prefecture
Kinokawa

Climate
Kaizuka has a Humid subtropical climate (Köppen Cfa) characterized by warm summers and cool winters with light to no snowfall.  The average annual temperature in Kaizuka is 14.6 °C. The average annual rainfall is 1475 mm with September as the wettest month. The temperatures are highest on average in August, at around 26.6 °C, and lowest in January, at around 3.3 °C.

Demographics
Per Japanese census data, the population of Kaizuka has increased steadily over the last century..

History
The area of the modern city of Izumisano was within ancient Izumi Province. The area was a stronghold of Ishiyama Hongan-ji during the Sengoku period. In the Edo Period, much of the city area was controlled by the Osaka machi-bugyō and by Kishiwada Domain. After the Meiji restoration, the town of Kaizuka established within Minami District with the creation of the modern municipalities system on April 1, 1889, along with the villages of Asogou, Shima, Kijima and Nishi-Katsuragi. Kita-Kogi and Minami-Kogi (within Hine District) were also formed. On  April 1, 1896 the area became part of Sennan District, Osaka. Kaizuka annexed Asogou, Shima, Kita-Kogi, and Minami-Kogi on April1, 1931, Kijima on April 15, 1935 and  Nishi-Katsuragi on April 1, 1939. Kaizuka was elevated to city status on October 1, 1943.

Government
Kaizuka has a mayor-council form of government with a directly elected mayor and a unicameral city council of 18 members. Kaizuka contributes one member to the Osaka Prefectural Assembly. In terms of national politics, the city is part of Osaka 19th district of the lower house of the Diet of Japan.

Economy
Kaizuka has been famous for its production of wooden combs since ancient times. Made of boxwood, this remains an important handicraft  and is the motif of the city's mascot character. The city economy is a mixture of industrial (textiles, steel wire and rope) and agriculture (onions, eggplant). Many residents commute to larger cities to the north, including Sakai and Osaka. Taking advantage of the city's proximity to Kansai International Airport, the Nishikinohama Industrial Park was constructed by reclaiming the offshore area of on the right bank of the mouth of the Kogi River.

Education
Kaizuka has 11 public elementary schools and five public middle schools operated by the city government and three public high schools operated by the Osaka Prefectural Department of Education. There is also one private high school. The Osaka Kawasaki Rehabilitation University is also located in Kaizuka.

Transportation

Airport 
 Kansai International Airport

Railway
 JR West – Hanwa Line
 -  
 Nankai Electric Railway -   Nankai Main Line
  - 
Mizuma Railway - Mizuma Line 
  -  -  -  -  -  -  -  -  -

Highway
 Hanshin Expressway
  Hanwa Expressway
  Kansai-Kūkō Expressway

Local attractions
Mizuma-dera
Koon-ji
Gansen-ji
 Kumano Kodo
Okumizuma Onsen
Nishikinohama Beach

Sports

Sister city relations
  Culver City, California, United States (since 1965)
  Saint Helier, Jersey

Notable people from Kaizuka
Atsushi Kotoge, professional wrestler
Aya Hisakawa, voice actress, singer

References

External links
  

 
Cities in Osaka Prefecture
Populated coastal places in Japan